{{safesubst:#invoke:RfD||2=Phulrraa|month = March
|day =  6
|year = 2023
|time = 18:13
|timestamp = 20230306181308

|content=
REDIRECT Pulrah

}}